Töfsingdalen (literally The Töfsing Valley) is a Swedish national park in Älvdalen Municipality, Dalarna County.

References

External links 
 Sweden's National Parks: Töfsingdalen National Park from the Swedish Environmental Protection Agency

National parks of Sweden
Protected areas established in 1930
1930 establishments in Sweden
Geography of Dalarna County
Tourist attractions in Dalarna County